The government of Curaçao, a "constituent country" of the Kingdom of the Netherlands, takes place in a framework of a parliamentary representative democratic country, whereby the prime minister is the head of government, and of a multi-party system. Executive power is exercised by the government. Legislative power is vested in both the government and parliament. The judiciary is independent of the executive and the legislature. Curaçao has full autonomy on most matters, with the exceptions summed up in the Charter for the Kingdom of the Netherlands under the title "Kingdom affairs". The Constitution of Curaçao was ratified in September 2010, and entered into force on 10 October 2010 upon the dissolution of the Netherlands Antilles.

Executive power 
Executive power rests with a governor, and a prime minister heads a Cabinet. The governor of Curaçao is appointed for a six-year term by the monarch (on from 2013: King Willem-Alexander), and the prime minister and deputy prime minister are elected by the Staten for four-year terms.

Cabinet

The cabinet was sworn in on 7 June 2013, and was characterized as a "political" cabinet, set to complete the full term of parliament.  The cabinet is based on a majority in the Estates of Curaçao of the parties PS, PAIS and PNP, as well independent member Glenn Sulvaran (formerly PAR)

|Prime Minister
|Ivar Asjes
|PS
|7 June 2013
|-
|Minister of Economic Development
|Stanley Palm
|PAIS
|7 June 2013
|-
|Minister of Finance
|José Jardim
|
|31 December 2012
|-
|Minister of Health, Environment, and Nature
|Denzil (Ben) Whiteman
|PS
|31 December 2012
|-
|Minister of Government Policy, Planning and Services
|Etienne van der Horst
|PAIS
|31 December 2012
|-
|Minister of Justice
|Nelson Navarro
|PAIS
|31 December 2012
|-
|Minister of Education, Science, Culture and Sports
|Irene Dick
|PS
|27 December 2013
|-
|Minister of Social Development, Labor and Welfare
|Jeanne Francisca
|PS
|7 June 2013
|-
|Minister of Traffic, Transport and urban Planning
|Earl Winston Balborda
|PNP
|31 December 2012
|-
|Minister Plenipotentiary
|Marvelyne Wiels
|PS
|7 June 2013
|}

Legislative power 
Legislative power is shared by the government and the legislature. The legislature or Estates of Curaçao is made up of 21 members elected by direct, popular vote to serve four-year terms. The current composition is shown below

Judicial power 
Curaçao's judicial system, which has mainly been derived from the Dutch civil law system, operates independently of the legislature and the executive. It has one court of first instance: the Gerecht in Eerste Aanleg, Curaçao, and an appeal court the Joint Court of Justice of Aruba, Curaçao, Sint Maarten, and of Bonaire, Sint Eustatius and Saba, which it shares with the other Dutch entities in the Caribbean. No appeal is possible to decisions of the Joint Court of Justice, but fundamental "questions of law" may be submitted to the Supreme Court of the Netherlands and the Hoge Raad der Nederlanden in cassation. Verdicts by those institutions may lead to a new decision of the Joint Court, taking into account the results of the cassation.

References 

 
Politics of Curaçao